Perilampsis is a genus of tephritid  or fruit flies in the family Tephritidae.

Species
The genus includes the following species.

 Perilampsis amazuluana
 Perilampsis atra
 Perilampsis decellei
 Perilampsis diademata
 Perilampsis dryades
 Perilampsis furcata
 Perilampsis miratrix
 Perilampsis pulchella
 Perilampsis umbrina
 Perilampsis woodi

References

 
Dacinae
Tephritidae genera